Chester Jermaine "Lyfe" Jennings (born June 3, 1978) is an American R&B and soul singer-songwriter, record producer, and instrumentalist.  He plays the guitar, bass, and piano which he integrates into his music. The New York Times referred to him as a "socially minded R&B singer".

Biography

Lyfe Jennings was born on June 3, 1978 in Toledo, Ohio to a working-class family and was the middle of five kids. When he was a teenager, Jennings started to perform with his brother and two cousins. In the beginning of the 1990s the group disbanded. During this time, Jennings began to get into legal trouble and his musical career came to a halt when he was sent to prison at the age of 14 for firebombing a house, killing a woman.

Career

2002-2005

In 2002, after serving 10 years in prison, Lyfe returned to his musical aspirations. Two days after his December 2002 release from prison, he recorded a four-song demo CD.  A month after that LP was released, he performed at The Apollo. He was booed as he walked onto the stage, but when the Apollo audience heard his gritty falsetto and lyrical songwriting, they were swayed to the tune of five amateur-night victories in a row. Lyfe sold about 1,000 copies of his four-song demo CD during his Apollo "residency." His growing success influenced Lyfe to move to New York City and pursue a major-label deal. Columbia Records provided him with a contract and released his debut, Lyfe 268-192 in August 2004. A year after its original release, the album was reissued with a new version of "Hypothetically" added as bonus track featuring American Idol winner, Fantasia.

2005-2013

Lyfe released a more hip-hop-oriented follow-up The Phoenix arrived in August 2006, with Three 6 Mafia and Young Buck making guest appearances. Lyfe Change released in April 2008, featuring a handful of new production associates as well as a verse from T.I. Jennings. Subsequently, Lyfe accepted a new deal with Warner Bros. and began working on another album, tentatively titled Sooner or Later, which he stated would be his last. The album was finally released in August 2010 and featured guest spots from Bryan-Michael Cox, Warryn Campbell, Fabolous, Bobby Valentino, Ludacris, Anthony Hamilton, and Jazmine Sullivan. Lyfe completed another prison stint for his actions stemming from a 2008 domestic dispute.

2013-Present

He returned to music in October 2013 with Lucid, released on the Mass Appeal label. Like all of his previous studio releases, it peaked in the Top 10 of Billboard's R&B chart. Tree of Lyfe, recorded primarily in his home studio, followed in June 2015. On his new album, Tree of Lyfe, Lyfe Jennings describes it as his most personal work to date and produced the majority of the album at  his home studio in Greenwood, Mississippi . When asked about his current musical mindset, Lyfe Jennings response is one of reflection and experience, "Everybody feels like they have to reinvent themselves. I don’t think you can reinvent the truth. It is what it is. I’m not focused on reinvention. I want to go deeper. This album reaffirms the reasons why people started loving this music in the first place."

Personal life
Jennings was previously engaged to Joy Bounds, the mother of his two oldest children. In October 2008 Jennings, after arguing with Bounds, followed her to her family's house in Smyrna, Georgia. At the residence he destroyed the door, fired shots in the street, and led police on a high-speed chase that ended when he crashed his 2005 Chevrolet Corvette. In September 2010 he was sentenced to three and a half years in prison after he pleaded guilty to multiple charges arising from the incident. On February 2, 2016, he married Gwendolyn Scharkowski, a German model. They have a son. On March 15, 2016, Gwendolyn filed for divorce.

Discography

Studio albums
 Lyfe 268‒192 (2004)
 The Phoenix (2006)
 Lyfe Change (2008)
 I Still Believe (2010)
 Lucid (2013)
 Tree of Lyfe (2015)
 777 (2019)

References

External links
Official site
Lyfe's Yahoo! Music profile
Lyfe's VH1 Profile

Articles containing video clips
1978 births
Living people
20th-century African-American male singers
African-American pianists
African-American record producers
American hip hop singers
American rhythm and blues guitarists
American male guitarists
American rhythm and blues singer-songwriters
American neo soul singers
Musicians from Toledo, Ohio
Record producers from Ohio
Singer-songwriters from Ohio
Participants in American reality television series
Guitarists from Ohio
American contemporary R&B singers
American male pianists
21st-century American singers
21st-century American pianists
21st-century American guitarists
21st-century American male singers
African-American songwriters
African-American guitarists
21st-century African-American male singers
American male singer-songwriters